Shekta (also Romanized as Shektā and Sheketā; also known as Shegtā) is a village in Kolijan Rostaq-e Olya Rural District, Kolijan Rostaq District, Sari County, Mazandaran Province, Iran. At the 2006 census, its population was 888, in 228 families.

References 

Populated places in Sari County